Lambda Pi Eta is the official Communication Studies honor society of the National Communication Association (NCA). As a member of the Association of College Honor Societies (ACHS), Lambda Pi Eta has more than 500 active chapters at four-year colleges and universities worldwide.

History 
Lambda Pi Eta  was founded in 1985 at the University of Arkansas.  Lambda Pi Eta became a part of the National Communication Association in 1988, and the official honor society of the NCA in July 1995.
 
Lambda Pi Eta represents what Aristotle described in his book, Rhetoric, as the three artistic proofs of persuasion: Logos (Lambda) meaning logic, Pathos (Pi) relating to emotion, and Ethos (Eta) defined as character credibility and ethics.

LPH is a member of the Association of College Honor Societies (ACHS), whose mission is to build a visibly cohesive community of national and international honor societies, individually and collaboratively exhibiting excellence in scholarship, service, programs, and governance.

Purpose 
The Six Goals of Lambda Pi Eta:

Recognize, foster, and reward outstanding scholastic achievement in communication studies;
Stimulate interest in the field of communication;
Promote and encourage professional development among communication majors;
Provide an opportunity to discuss and exchange ideas in the field of communication;
Establish and maintain closer relationships between faculty and students; and
Explore options for graduate education in communication studies.

Member requirements 
In order to become a member of Lambda Pi Eta, students must have a 3.0 cumulative GPA with 60 semester or 90 quarter credit hours completed and a 3.25 GPA for communication studies courses with 12 semester or 18 quarter credit hours completed.

Member benefits 
Benefits that come with membership of Lambda Pi Eta include:
Vote at all chapter meetings of the Society
Be elected to chapter offices
Attend scholarly presentations and colloquia of the sponsoring academic department
Represent the local chapter at state, regional, and national conventions
Submit to the LPH research paper sessions at NCA’s annual convention (undergraduates only)
Receive LPH electronic newsletter “Simply Speaking”
Submit a paper for possible publication in LPH’s annual journal
Utilize LPH’s Experience.com online job service for honor students
Participate in LPH social media efforts via Linked-In, Facebook and Twitter
Participate in periodic teleconferences on topics ranging from career development to chapter management
Compete for various LPH national awards.

Chapter list 

Chapter list available here: Current chapters.

See also 
Lambda Pi Eta national website

References 

https://web.archive.org/web/20140222010539/http://www.natcom.org/Secondary.aspx?id=204
https://web.archive.org/web/20140301003530/http://www.natcom.org/Tertiary.aspx?id=544
  ACHS Lambda Pi Eta entry
  Lambda Pi Eta chapter list at ACHS

Association of College Honor Societies
Honor societies
Student organizations established in 1985
1985 establishments in Arkansas